José "Patón" González (born July 21, 1971, in Puerto La Cruz, Venezuela) is a Venezuelan footballer currently playing for Deportivo Anzoátegui of the Primera División in Venezuela.

Teams
  Deportivo Táchira 1990-1996
  Everton 1997
  Universidad de Concepción 1998
  Deportivo Táchira 1999-2004
  Unión Atlético Maracaibo 2005-2006
  Zamora 2006
  Estudiantes de Mérida 2007
  Deportivo Táchira 2007-2009
  Deportivo Anzoátegui 2009–present

Titles
  Deportivo Anzoátegui 2009 (Venezuelan Primera División Championship)

References
 

1971 births
Living people
Venezuelan footballers
Venezuelan expatriate footballers
Zamora FC players
UA Maracaibo players
Deportivo Anzoátegui players
Estudiantes de Mérida players
Deportivo Táchira F.C. players
Universidad de Concepción footballers
Everton de Viña del Mar footballers
Primera B de Chile players
Expatriate footballers in Chile
Venezuelan expatriate sportspeople in Chile
Association footballers not categorized by position
People from Puerto la Cruz
Monagas S.C. managers
Deportivo Anzoátegui managers
Llaneros Escuela de Fútbol managers